Rəsullu (also, Rassuli and Rassuly) is a village and municipality in the Imishli Rayon of Azerbaijan.  It has a population of 1,369.

References 

Populated places in Imishli District